Moxwêra wa Babaso was a newspaper published in Middelburg, Transvaal, South Africa, from 1903 to 1950, by the Berlin Missionary Society.

References

Zulu-language mass media
Defunct newspapers published in South Africa
Publications established in 1903
Christian newspapers
Publications disestablished in 1950